Milanion is a genus of skipper butterflies.

References

Pyrginae
Hesperiidae genera
Taxa named by Frederick DuCane Godman
Taxa named by Osbert Salvin